This is a list of people notable for playing the oud:

A
Mohammed Abdel Wahab
Rabih Abou-Khalil
Ahmed Abdul-Malik
Rahim AlHaj
Abdel Karim al Kabli
Khyam Allami
Tarek Abdallah

B
Jamil Bachir
Munir Bashir
Omar Bashir
Hossein Behroozinia
John Bilezikjian
John Berberian
Waed Bouhassoun
Anouar Brahem
Sandy Bull
Roman Bunka
Yorgo Bacanos
Negar Bouban

D
Fatemeh Deghani
Yair Dalal
Hamza El Din
Ara Dinkjian
Jo Dusepo

E
Driss El Maloumi
Abdel Aziz El Mubarak

F
Farid al-Atrash

H
Richard Hagopian
Sakher Hattar

J
Wissam Joubran

K
Georges Kazazian
Tigrane Kazazian
Chris Karrer
Udi Hrant Kenkulian
Gülçin Yahya Kaçar

L
Chris Leslie
David Lindley

M
Aar Maanta
Hamdi Makhlouf
Daron Malakian
Jiim Sheikh Muumin
Omar Metioui
Mutref Al Mutref

N
Hani Naser
Mansour Nariman

Q
Abdullahi Qarshe

S
Simon Shaheen
Naseer Shamma
Ali Sriti
Riad Al Sunbati

T
Cinuçen Tanrıkorur
Joseph Tawadros
Omar Faruk Tekbilek
Zaidoon Treeko

Y
Haig Yazdjian
Dhafer Youssef

References

Oud